Malianwa Subdistrict is a subdistrict situated on northeastern Haidian District, Beijing, China. It shares border with Xibeiwan Town in the north and west, Shangdi Subdistrict in the east, Qinglongqiao Subdistrict in the south, and contains two exclaves of Qinglongqiao Subdistrict. In 2020 its population was 119,022. 

Originally this region was known was Malanwa for its low-lying landscape and abundance of Kalimeris indica. Over time the name was corrupted to Malianwa.

History

Administrative Divisions 
As of 2021, Malianwa Subdistrict administered 20 communities within its border:

See also 

 List of township-level divisions of Beijing

References 

Haidian District
Subdistricts of Beijing